Tannery Brook flows into the Mohawk River in North Western, New York.

References 

Rivers of New York (state)
Mohawk River
Rivers of Oneida County, New York